Acanthemblemaria is a genus of chaenopsid blennies native to the Atlantic and Pacific Oceans.

Etymology 
Acanthemblemaria: Greek, akantha = thorn + Greek, emblema, -atos, anything that is nailed, knocked in; also anything with bass or high relief

Description 
Body elongated; head short and blunt; pointed or blunt spines on snout, below eye, sometimes on top of head; 2 rows of very well developed teeth on the roof of the mouth; 1 pair of branched or unbranched cirri over eyes; cirri over nostrils; usually with a notch between the spiny and soft parts of the dorsal fin

Species
The 21 recognized species in this genus are:
 Acanthemblemaria aspera (Longley, 1927) (roughhead blenny)	
 Acanthemblemaria atrata Hastings & D. R. Robertson, 1999 (Cocos barnacle blenny)
 Acanthemblemaria balanorum Brock, 1940 (clubhead blenny)	
 Acanthemblemaria betinensis Smith-Vaniz & Palacio, 1974 (speckled blenny)
 Acanthemblemaria castroi J. S. Stephens & Hobson, 1966 (Galapagos barnacle blenny)
 Acanthemblemaria chaplini J. E. Böhlke, 1957 (papillose blenny)
 Acanthemblemaria crockeri Beebe & Tee-Van, 1938 (browncheek blenny)
 Acanthemblemaria exilispinus J. S. Stephens, 1963 (bluntspine blenny)
 Acanthemblemaria greenfieldi Smith-Vaniz & Palacio, 1974 (false papillose blenny)
 Acanthemblemaria hancocki G. S. Myers & Reid, 1936 (Hancock's blenny)
 Acanthemblemaria harpeza J. T. Williams, 2002
 Acanthemblemaria hastingsi H. C. Lin & Galland, 2010 (Cortez barnacle blenny)
 Acanthemblemaria johnsoni Almany & C. C. Baldwin, 1996
 Acanthemblemaria macrospilus Brock, 1940 (barnacle blenny)
 Acanthemblemaria mangognatha Hastings & D. R. Robertson, 1999 (Revillagigedo barnacle blenny)
 Acanthemblemaria maria J. E. Böhlke] 1961 (secretary blenny)
 Acanthemblemaria medusa Smith-Vaniz & Palacio, 1974 (Medusa blenny)
 Acanthemblemaria paula G. D. Johnson & Brothers, 1989 (dwarf spinyhead blenny)
 Acanthemblemaria rivasi J. S. Stephens, 1970 (spotjaw blenny)
 Acanthemblemaria spinosa Metzelaar, 1919 (spinyhead blenny)
 Acanthemblemaria stephensi Rosenblatt & McCosker, 1988 (Malpelo barnacle blenny)

Behavior and diet 
Acanthemblemaria are mostly filter feeding fishes, they inhabit coral reefs, rocky reefs and abandoned worm and mollusc tubes.

They feed mostly on passing benthic crustaceans, zooplankton, benthic worms,

References 

 
Chaenopsidae
Marine fish genera